Tjitte Weistra (born 2 December 1975) is a retired male badminton player from The Netherlands. He became a Peruvian badminton player in 2003, then in 2010 he became a New Zealand badminton player.

Career achievements

References

External links 
 WORLD SENIOR CHAMPIONSHIPS – Tjitte Weistra "My experience"

1975 births
Living people
Dutch male badminton players
Peruvian male badminton players
New Zealand male badminton players